Robert Angus Brooks (1920–1976) was an American philologist and under secretary at the Smithsonian Institution.  He also served as Assistant Secretary of the Army for Installations and Logistics under the Johnson Administration.

References

1920 births
1976 deaths
American philologists
United States Army civilians
Lyndon B. Johnson administration personnel
20th-century philologists
Linguists from the United States